"Undercover Angel" is a song by singer-songwriter Alan O'Day. Released as a single in 1977, it was certified gold, having reached No. 1 on the Billboard Hot 100 (one of 1977's ten biggest hits) and No. 9 on the Australian Singles Chart.

Background
In 1977, Warner Bros. Music decided to form a special label, Pacific Records, for their composers who also performed. O'Day was the first artist signed, and his first release was "Undercover Angel". The original vinyl pressing was released with the B-side "Just You".

The song, which O'Day described as a "nocturnal novelette", was released without fanfare in February 1977. Within a few months, it had reached No. 1 in the US, even without an album to support it. O'Day said of the experience, "It's wonderful when you find out what feels right, and then it also feels right to other people. That's a songwriter's dream." O'Day had also composed "Angie Baby", a No. 1 hit for Helen Reddy. The success of these two songs means O'Day is among the few singer-songwriters who wrote a chart-topper for themselves and one for another artist.

Storyline
The song begins with a man describing his loneliness, when a woman suddenly appears in his bed and encourages him to make love to her.  The rest of the song describes his feelings about her, then he discovers she must leave him, and he is saddened.  She tells him to  "go find the right one, love her and then, when you look into her eyes you'll see me again".

It then becomes apparent that he has been telling this story to a woman he is trying to seduce; he tells her he is "looking for my angel in your sweet, loving eyes", Underneath the covers (thus explaining the mystery of the song’s title).

Chart performance

Weekly charts

Year-end charts

Use in media
"Undercover Angel" was used in the 2011 J. J. Abrams film Super 8.

See also
List of Hot 100 number-one singles of 1977 (U.S.)
List of RPM number-one singles of 1977
List of 1970s one-hit wonders in the United States

References

External links
 Lyrics of this song
 Alan O'Day's official website
 

1977 songs
1977 singles
Billboard Hot 100 number-one singles
Cashbox number-one singles
RPM Top Singles number-one singles
Song recordings produced by Michael Omartian
Songs written by Alan O'Day